P. T. A. Rahim is an Indian politician from Kerala. He is from the Indian National League. He represents the Kunnamangalam constituency in Kozhikode district and Pro-tem Speaker in the Kerala Legislative Assembly.

Career
Born at Koduvally in Kozhikode district on 8 March 1949, Rahim started his political career through MSF during his college days. He completed a B.Com. degree at Farook College and LLB at Government Law College, Kozhikode. He was secretary of the Indian Union Muslim League Kozhikode District Committee and he was also President of Koduvally Grama Panchayath (1988–1993, 1998–2006). He left the Muslim League in early 2000s and formed Muslim League(R) with his followers. He made a successful movement in the Panachayat election held in 2005 with the support of Left Front in Koduvally.

He became a noted politician when he defeated K. Muraleedharan, the UDF candidate in Koduvally constituency in 2006 elections. In early 2011 with the support of LDF, under the leadership of P. T. A. Rahim a new party, National Secular Conference (NSC) was formed, which aimed to protect the rights of Dalits, religious minorities and other backward sections of people.

The party was later merged with Indian National League

Assembly Election Victories

References 

1949 births
Living people
Malayali politicians
People from Kozhikode district
Kerala MLAs 2011–2016
Kerala MLAs 2016–2021
Indian National League politicians